Ursula Torday (19 February 1912 in London, England – 6 March 1997), was a British writer of some 60 gothic, romance and mystery novels from 1935 to 1982. She also used the pseudonyms of Paula Allardyce, Charity Blackstock, Lee Blackstock, and Charlotte Keppel. In 1961, her novel Witches' Sabbath won the Romantic Novel of the Year Award by the Romantic Novelists' Association

Biography

Early years
Ursula Joyce Torday was born on 19 February 1912 (in some sources wrongly 1888) in London, England, United Kingdom; her mother, Gaia Rose Macdonald, was Scottish, and her father, Emil Torday (1875–1931) was a Hungarian anthropologist - they had married on 17 March 1910.

She studied at Kensington High School in London before going to Oxford University, where she obtained a BA in English at Lady Margaret Hall College; she later achieved a Social Science Certificate at London School of Economics.

First jobs
In the 1930s, she published her first three novels under her real name: Ursula Torday.

During World War II, she worked as a probation officer for the Citizen's Advice Bureau. During the next seven years she also ran a refugee scheme for Jewish children, an inspiration for several of her future novels such as The Briar Patch (a.k.a. Young Lucifer); The Children (a.k.a. Wednesday's Children) is her memoir about her work with children of the Holocaust. She worked as a typist at the National Central Library (England and Wales) in London, inspiration for her future novel Dewey Death as Charity Blackstock. She also taught English to adult students.

Writing career
She returned to publishing in the early 1950s using the pen names of Paula Allardyce or Charity Blackstock (in some cases reedited as Lee Blackstock in the USA) to sign her gothic romance and mystery novels. Later, she also used the pen name Charlotte Keppel. She published her last novel in 1982.

Her novel Miss Fenny (a.k.a. The Woman in the Woods) as Charity (or Lee) Blackstock was nominated for an Edgar Award. In 1961, her novel Witches' Sabbath won the Romantic Novel of the Year Award by the Romantic Novelists' Association

Ursula Torday died on 6 March 1997, at 85.

Bibliography

As Ursula Torday

 The Ballad-Maker of Paris (1935)
 No Peace for the Wicked (1937)
 The Mirror of the Sun (1938)

As Paula Allardyce

 After the Lady (1954)
 A Game of Hazard (1955)
 The Doctor's Daughter (1955)
 Adam and Evelina (1956)
 The Man of Wrath (1958)
 Southarn Folly(1957)
 The Lady and the Pirate (1957) a.k.a. The Vixen's Revenge (US title)
 Beloved Enemy (1958)
 My Dear Miss Emma (1958)
 A Marriage Has Been Arranged (1959)
 Death My Lover (1959)
 Johnny Danger (1960) a.k.a. The Rebel Lover (US title)
 Witches' Sabbath (1961)
 The Gentle Highwayman (1961) a.k.a. The Rogue's Lady (US title)
 Adam's Rib (1963) a.k.a. Legacy of Pride (US title)
 The Respectable Miss Parkington-Smith (1964) a.k.a. Paradise Row (US title)
 Octavia: Or the Trials of a Romantic Novelist (1965)
 The Moonlighters (1966) Gentleman Rogue (US title)
 Six Passengers for the Sweet Bird (1967)
 Waiting at the Church (1968) a.k.a. Emily (US title)
 The Ghost of Archie Gilroy (1970) a.k.a. Shadowed Love (US title)
 Miss Jonas's Boy (1972) a.k.a. Eliza (US title)
 The Gentle Sex (1974)
 The Carradine Affair (1976)
 Miss Philadelphia Smith (1977)
 Haunting Me (1978)

As Charity Blackstock

 Dewey Death (1956)
 Miss Fenny (1957) a.k.a. The Woman in the Woods (US title)
 The Foggy, Foggy Dew (1958)
 The Shadow of Murder (1958) a.k.a. All Men Are Murderers as Lee Blackstock (US title)
 The Bitter Conquest (1959)
 The Briar Patch (1960) a.k.a. Young Lucifer as Ursula Torday (US title)
 The Exorcism (1961) a.k.a. A House Possessed (US title)
 The Gallant (1962)
 Mr. Christopoulos (1963)
 The Factor's Wife (1964) a.k.a. The English Wife (US title)
 When the Sun Goes Down (1965) a.k.a. Monkey on a Chain (US title)
 The Knock at Midnight (1966)
 The Children (1966) a.k.a. Wednesday's Children (US title)--memoir
 Party in Dolly Creek (1967) a.k.a. The Widow (US title)
 The Melon in the Cornfield (1969) a.k.a. The Lemmings (US title)
 The Daughter (1970)
 The Encounter (1971)
 The Jungle (1972)
 The Lonely Strangers (1972)
 People in Glass Houses (1975)
 Ghost Town (1976)
 I Met Murder on the Way (1977) a.k.a. The Shirt Front (US title)
 Miss Charley (1979)
 Dream Towers (1980)
 With Fondest Thoughts (1980)

As Charlotte Keppel

 Madam, You Must Die (1974) a.k.a. Loving Sands, Deadly Sands (US title)
 When I Say Goodbye, I'm Clary Brown (1976) My name is Clary Brown (US title)
 I Could Be Good to You (1980)
 The Villains (1980)
 The Ghosts of Fontenoy (1981)
 The Flag Captain (1982)

References and sources

1912 births
1997 deaths
English romantic fiction writers
English crime fiction writers
Writers of historical romances
Writers from London
RoNA Award winners
20th-century English novelists
20th-century English women writers
Women romantic fiction writers
English women novelists
Women historical novelists
Women crime fiction writers
Pseudonymous women writers
20th-century pseudonymous writers